Guy Aitchison (born 1968) is an American tattoo artist and painter. He was featured on the tattoo reality television shows LA Ink and Tattoo Wars.

Biography 
Guy Aitchison was born in Michigan. He began painting album covers in 1985 and began tattooing in 1988. He has also released several books. He owns a studio called Hyperspace Studios with his wife, Michele Wortman, who is also a tattoo artist and painter. They were both on TLC's Tattoo Wars in 2007. He is the brother of tattoo artist and television personality, Hannah Aitchison. He was also a guest artist on LA Ink.

He gave Rob Zombie his first tattoo in 1989 when he was 21.

Guy Aitchison was already in an apprenticeship at the Jacklich Corporation in the art department by age 17. After completing his apprenticeship, he began painting record covers for Vinnie Moore, David Chastain, Apocrypha, Hex, Skatenigs, and mostly for California-based Shrapnel Records. In 1989, he began a tattooing apprenticeship at Bob Oslon's Custom Tattooing in Chicago for two years. He opened his own tattoo studio, Guilty & Innocent Productions, which remained a top standing shop until 1998 when it shut down so that he could move to the country to focus more on painting.

Books 
 Reinventing the Tattoo (2001)
 Organica (2005)
 The Biomech Encyclopedia (2019)

References

External links 
 Official website
 

Living people
American tattoo artists
1968 births
20th-century American painters
20th-century American male artists
American male painters
21st-century American painters
21st-century American male artists
Artists from Ann Arbor, Michigan
Painters from Michigan